M. Krishnasamy is an Indian politician and incumbent member of the Parliament of India from Arani Constituency. He represents the Indian National Congress party. He also Served as the President of Tamil Nadu Congress Committee until 2008.

References 

Living people
India MPs 2009–2014
Indian National Congress politicians
Lok Sabha members from Tamil Nadu
India MPs 1991–1996
People from Tiruvannamalai district
Year of birth missing (living people)
Indian National Congress politicians from Tamil Nadu